Kim Min-Kyu (sometimes listed as Min-Kyu Kim, born August 11, 1983) is a South Korean luger who competed from 1999 to 2006. Competing in two Winter Olympics, he earned his best finish of 29th in the men's singles event at Turin in 2006.

References
 2002 luge men's singles results
 2006 luge men's singles results
 FIL-Luge profile: Kim Min, Kyu

External links
 
 
 

1983 births
Living people
South Korean male lugers
Olympic lugers of South Korea
Lugers at the 2002 Winter Olympics
Lugers at the 2006 Winter Olympics